The 1987–88 ACB season was the 5th season of the ACB Primera División, the top Spanish professional basketball league. It started on 26 September 1987 with the first round of the regular season and ended on 24 May 1988 with the finals.

FC Barcelona won their second consecutive ACB title, and their fifth Spanish title.

Teams

Promotion and relegation (pre-season)
A total of 16 teams contested the league, including 14 sides from the 1986–87 season and two promoted from the 1986–87 Primera División B.

Teams promoted from Primera División B
Caja Ronda
Bancobao Villalba

Venues and locations

First phase

Group Odd

Group Even

Second phase

Group A1

Group A2

Playoffs

Championship playoffs

Source: Linguasport

Relegation playoffs

|}
Source: Linguasport

Final standings

Notes

References

External links
 Official website 
 Linguasport 

 
Spanish
Liga ACB seasons